Ben Thomas (born May 28, 1996) is a Canadian professional ice hockey defenceman who is currently playing under contract to Tappara of the Liiga in Finland.

Playing career
Thomas was selected by the Tampa Bay Lightning, 119th overall, in the 2014 NHL Entry Draft, while playing major junior hockey with the Calgary Hitmen of the Western Hockey League (WHL).

Following the conclusion of his final junior season, finishing second amongst defenseman in scoring on the Vancouver Giants, Thomas was signed to a three-year, entry-level contract with the Tampa Bay Lightning on March 23, 2016. Thomas immediately joined AHL affiliate, the Syracuse Crunch, and made his professional debut to end the 2015–16 season, recording 4 points in 8 regular season games.

After the expiration of his entry-level contract, he re-signed with Tampa Bay on a one-year, two-way contract on October 12, 2020.

On April 4, 2021, Thomas skated in his first career NHL game against the Detroit Red Wings at Amalie Arena.

As a free agent from the Lightning after six seasons within the organization, Thomas opted to pursue a career abroad, agreeing to a one-year contract with Swedish top flight club, Leksands IF of the SHL, on August 25, 2021. In the 2021–22 season, Thomas made 32 appearances with Leksands however was unable to make an impact in recording just 3 points. On February 10, 2022, he transferred mid-season to fellow SHL club, Växjö Lakers, for the remainder of the campaign.

Continuing his European career, Thomas signed as a free agent to a one-year contract with Finnish club, Tappara of the Liiga, on August 18, 2022.

Career statistics

Regular season and playoffs

International

References

External links

1996 births
Living people
Canadian ice hockey defencemen
Calgary Canucks players
Calgary Hitmen players
Calgary Mustangs players
Leksands IF players
Ice hockey people from Calgary
Syracuse Crunch players
Tampa Bay Lightning draft picks
Tampa Bay Lightning players
Tappara players
Vancouver Giants players
Växjö Lakers players